Christopher D. Foote (born December 2, 1956) is a former American football center.

College career
Foote played college football at the University of Southern California.
1976 (2nd) Polls, 1978 (1st) UPI Poll and 1979 (2nd) Polls
Over all four year record 44–6–1, 1978–79 : 22–1–1

Professional career
He was drafted in the sixth round (144th overall) of the 1980 NFL Draft.  He played for the National Football League (NFL)'s Baltimore Colts between 1980 and 1981, for the New York Giants in 1982 and 1983 and for the Minnesota Vikings between 1987 and 1991.,  Foote also played in the United States Football League (USFL) for the Los Angeles Express and the Tampa Bay Bandits in 1984 and the Tampa Bay Bandits in 1985.

1956 births
Living people
Players of American football from Louisville, Kentucky
American football centers
USC Trojans football players
Baltimore Colts players
New York Giants players
Minnesota Vikings players
Los Angeles Express players
Tampa Bay Bandits players